Mark Ghanimé (born December 1, 1977) is a Canadian actor. He is known for his roles as Major Sergio Balleseros on the Syfy original series Helix, and for recurring as Don Carlos on The CW series Reign.

Early life
Ghanimé was born on December 1, 1977 in Calgary, Alberta, Canada to a Canadian mother and a Lebanese father. He spent time growing up in both Calgary and in Montreal, Quebec, Canada and was trilingual from an early age, speaking French, English, and Arabic due to his diverse heritage.

Ghanimé grew up focusing on academics with the intent of becoming a business man and going into real estate. He obtained a finance degree from the University of Lethbridge in Canada.  In his early twenties, Ghanimé began taking vocal lessons and hip-hop dance classes in order to explore his creative side. In 2004, Ghanimé had an uncredited, background role in Chasing Freedom starring Juliette Lewis. While on set, he became passionate for acting and knew he wanted to pursue it as a career.

Career
After starting his career acting in commercials, Ghanimé was cast in his first guest-starring role as Graham in the CBC Television series Wild Roses. He then had small guest starring roles on Smallville and Supernatural in 2010 and The Secret Circle, Fairly Legal, and Arrow in 2012. Starting in 2012, Ghanimé had a recurring role as Dr. Jamie Albagetti on The CW series Emily Owens, M.D. and a starring role as Daniel Goose-Egg in the web series Soldiers of the Apocalypse, for which he also served as associate producer. In 2013, he had supporting roles as Run in the Showcase miniseries Eve of Destruction and as the museum curator in the Hallmark Channel television movie The Hunters.

Ghanimé's most significant role came in 2014 when he was cast as a series regular in the Syfy original series Helix, playing Major Sergio Balleseros who guides a team of CDC scientists to investigate a disease outbreak at a research facility in the arctic. The series was cancelled on April 29, 2015 and aired for two seasons.

In 2015, Ghanimé was cast in the recurring role of Don Carlos in the third season of The CW series Reign. He also recurred as Justin Faysal on the Chiller horror anthology series Slasher in 2016.

in 2017, Ghanimé recurred on the second season of Private Eyes, playing a romantic interest of the main character, Angie Everett, played by Cindy Sampson.

Ghanimé currently stars as Dr. Cameron Hayek on Netflix's Virgin River

Personal life
He has visited Lebanon numerous times and wishes to portray more Middle-Eastern characters in order to bring positive light to the Middle East and accentuate the beauty of countries such as Lebanon which he says are rarely portrayed positively in the media.

Filmography

Film

Television

References

1977 births
21st-century Canadian male actors
Living people
Male actors from Calgary
Lebanese male actors
Canadian male television actors
Canadian people of Lebanese descent